The 1903 American Medical football team was an American football team that represented the University of Notre Dame in the 1903 college football season.

Schedule

References

American Medical
American Medical football seasons
American Medical football